David Albert Friedberg (born 1 June 1980) is an American entrepreneur, businessman, and angel investor. He founded and was chief executive of The Climate Corporation, whose $1.1 billion sale to Monsanto in 2013 made it the first unicorn in the emerging agricultural technology space. He is currently founder and CEO of The Production Board (TPB). He is a co-host of the All-In podcast. Spanning his career, he has contributed to 32 patents.

Early life and education 
Friedberg was born in 1980 in South Africa. At age six, Friedberg moved with his family to Los Angeles, California. In high school, Friedberg was president of the environmental club “Students H.O.P.E.” (Students Healing Our Planet Earth). At age 16, he entered Clarkson University, in Potsdam, New York, where he worked in a pool hall and learned to play poker. After one year in upstate New York, he transferred to University of California, Berkeley, where he had a part-time job doing mathematical modeling at the Lawrence Berkeley National Laboratory and received a Bachelor's Degree in Astrophysics in 2001.

Career

Google
After several years in investment banking and private equity, Friedberg joined Google in March 2004 as one of the first 1,000 employees and a founding member of Google’s Corporate Development group. As Corporate Development and Business Product Manager, Friedberg helped run Google's online advertising platform, AdWords, and negotiated acquisitions and worked with Google co-founder Larry Page.

The Climate Corporation
In 2006, he founded his first company, WeatherBill, to create and buy custom weather insurance online. Friedberg was still working at Google as a business product manager when the idea for the company came to him. He was driving past the Bike Hut in San Francisco and seeing sales slump on rainy days. The thought occurred to him that the impact of weather on a business must be a big problem. 

WeatherBill secured funding from Founders Fund, Khosla Ventures, Google Ventures, NEA, Index Ventures and Atomico. In 2011, Friedberg changed WeatherBill's name to The Climate Corporation. The Climate Corporation focused on offering farmers weather insurance and the climate.com service to help them track, analyze, and make field-specific decisions on their farms to improve farming outcomes. On 5 October 2011, Friedberg gave his Entrepreneurship Gives Life Meaning lecture at Stanford. 

In October 2013, Monsanto announced that it was acquiring The Climate Corporation for about $1.1 billion. Friedberg joined Monsanto's Executive Team after the acquisition and in 2016 shifted to an advisory role.

The Production Board
In 2016, Friedberg began talking with Larry Page about a way to build and finance more startups focused on food, agriculture, decarbonization and life sciences. Through parent company Alphabet, Page agreed to help finance a holding company that Friedberg would operate. Friedberg founded The Production Board (TPB) in 2016.

TPB works with scientists, entrepreneurs, and business experts with the objective of solving the biggest problems facing humanity, including climate change. TPB portfolio businesses include Pattern Ag, Ohalo, Culture Biosciences, Triplebar Bio, Supergut and Cana. 
In July 2021, Friedberg announced that The Production Board raised $300 million from Alphabet, Baillie Gifford, Allen & Co., BlackRock, Koch Disruptive Technologies and Morgan Stanley's Counterpoint Global.

Boards of directors and other roles
Friedberg is the founder of Metromile and served as Chairman of Metromile's Board of Directors during its early years. He is also an angel investor in various technology, food, agriculture, and life sciences startups. In 2014, he purchased Canadian quinoa supplier NorQuin, North America's largest supplier of quinoa. In 2022, Above Food Corp. acquired Norquin and appointed Friedberg to Above Food's Innovation Advisory Council.

Personal life 
Friedberg is one of the four co-hosts of All-In, a business and investment podcast with Chamath Palihapitiya, David O. Sacks, and Jason Calacanis.

Friedberg is a lifelong vegetarian.

References

External links

 
 
 David Friedberg's AngelList page
 

1980 births
Living people
Angel investors
American technology chief executives